Willis Hope "Weegie" Thompson (born March 21, 1961 in Pensacola, Florida) is a former professional American football player who played wide receiver for six seasons for the Pittsburgh Steelers. He played high school football for Midlothian High School in Richmond, Virginia. He was recruited by Florida State University as a quarterback.

College statistics
1981: 2 catches for 73 yards.
1982: 8 catches for 136 yards and 2 TD.
1983: 31 catches for 502 yards and 3 TD.

Professional career
Hall of Fame safety Ronnie Lott gushes when he talks about Thompson. In Thompson's rookie season, 1984, the Steelers were the only team to beat the 49ers. One reason they did was by assigning Thompson to block Lott on every play. "He blocked my butt all day -- and fair," Lott remembered. "Every play, he came after me. And I respect the hell out of Weegie Thompson to this day. He's one of the toughest guys I ever played against."

Personal
Thompson is called Weegie because his Father, Willis Sr., was nicknamed Weegie when his younger brother couldn't pronounce Willis. It came out Weegie. So, Weegie is Weegie Jr. (Willis).

After his playing days, Thompson took a position with Chambers Development before moving on to work as a salesman with Waste Management in Midlothian, Virginia.

References

1961 births
Living people
Players of American football from Pensacola, Florida
American football wide receivers
Florida State Seminoles football players
Pittsburgh Steelers players